Partido Social-Democrata  may refer to:

 Social Democratic Party (Angola)
 Social Democratic Party (Portugal)